The 114th Fighter Squadron (114 FS) is a unit of the Oregon Air National Guard 173d Fighter Wing located at Kingsley Field Air National Guard Base, Klamath Falls, Oregon. The 114th is equipped with the F-15C Eagle.

History

World War II
The squadron was first activated in mid-1942 as the 439th Bombardment Squadron, a B-26 Marauder medium bombardment unit. It trained under Third Air Force in Louisiana.  The unit was reassigned to the European Theater of Operations (ETO), being assigned initially to VIII Air Support Command in England in September 1942.  The 439th flew several missions over France and Belgium from its base in England during October, then was reassigned to the new Twelfth Air Force in Algeria.

During the North African Campaign, the squadron engaged in tactical bomb strikes of enemy targets, primarily in eastern Algeria and Tunisia, including railroads, airfields, harbor installations, and enemy shipping along the Mediterranean Coast.

The squadron returned to French Morocco in March 1943, then returned to combat in June 1943, attacking enemy targets on Italian islands in the Mediterranean, including Sicily, Sardinia, and Pantelleria. From bases in Algeria and Tunisia, the unit supported the Allied invasion of Italy, bombing bridges and marshalling yards during the late summer and early autumn of 1943.

In November, it moved to Sardinia, to strike Axis targets in central Italy. Early in 1944, the squadron supported Allied ground forces as they advanced in the Cassino and Anzio areas. Later in the year, the group attacked German supply lines in northern Italy, bombing bridges, marshalling yards, and roads. During the summer, it bombed bridges over the Po River in northern Italy to block the stream of German supplies and reinforcements going southward.  The unit supported the invasion of southern France in August 1944 by attacking coastal batteries, radar stations, and bridges. From Corsica, it hit railroad bridges in Northern Italy and late in the year attacked railroad lines through the Brenner Pass that connected Germany and Austria with Italy.

In January 1945, the squadron returned to the United States, where it began to train with A-26 aircraft for operations in the Pacific Theater of Operations. Between May and July 1945, it moved by ship to Okinawa, and on 16 July the squadron flew its first mission against Japan.  From then until the end of the fighting in early August, the squadron attacked enemy targets such as airfields and industrial centers on Kyūshū and the occupied Shanghai area of China, and shipping around the Ryukyu Islands and in the East China Sea. In November and December 1945 the squadron returned to the United States and was inactivated.

New York Air National Guard
The squadron was initially allotted to the Oregon Air National Guard on 24 May 1946 and redesignated the 114th Bombardment Squadron, Light.  It was transferred to the New York National Guard and received federal recognition on 26 June 1946 The 114th Bombardment Squadron was equipped with B-26 Invader light bombers and assigned to the 106th Bombardment Group at Floyd Bennett Field, Brooklyn.

When the Korean War broke out in June 1950, the entire 106th Bombardment Group was federalized and brought to active duty.  The group was moved to March Air Force Base, California and assigned to Fifteenth Air Force of Strategic Air Command (SAC). It was assigned B-29 Superfortress medium bombers, and the mission of the 106th Bomb Group was the training of reservists to backfill rotating B-29 combat crews serving on Okinawa. The Group served with SAC until returning to New York state control on 1 December 1952.

Upon return to Floyd Bennett Field, the 114th again was equipped with B-26s and resumed training with its light bombers and flew them until its conversion to an air defense fighter unit in 1956. Under Air Defense Command, the 106th Fighter-Interceptor Group initially received Lockheed F-94A Starfires and in 1957 the North American F-86D Sabre Interceptor.

The State of New York was notified by Headquarters, United States Air Force on 26 September 1957 that support for the 114th Fighter-Interceptor Squadron would be ended due to fiscal constraints.   Despite protests from the Governor of New York State that this was in violation of the law with respect to State militia units, the Air Force eventually prevailed and the 114th Fighter-Interceptor Squadron was inactivated on 30 September 1958.

Oregon Air National Guard

The 8123d Fighter-Interceptor Training Squadron was organized by the Oregon Air National Guard at Kingsley Field, Oregon in January 1983 as an F-4C Phantom II Formal Training Unit for the interceptor pilots of the 123d Fighter-Interceptor Squadron at Portland International Airport. On 1 October 1983 the unit was organized and federally recognized by the National Guard Bureau as the 114th Fighter-Interceptor Squadron, with the 114th designation being transferred back to the Oregon Air National Guard.

With the phaseout of the F-4C from the inventory in the late 1980s, the 114th was re-equipped with the F-16A/B block 15 Air Defense Fighter and continued its mission as a Formal Training Unit. On 1 April 1996, the 173d Fighter Wing was formed at Kingsley AGB as a host organization and parent unit for the 114th Fighter Squadron when the unit was authorized to expand, with the 114th being transferred from the 142d Fighter Wing at Portland to the new Wing at Kingsley ANGB. Along with the 114th FS, the 173d consists of the 173d Operations Group; 173d Maintenance Group, 173d Mission Support Group and 173d Medical Group.

With the 123d Fighter Squadron flying F-15 Eagles, the F-16As were retired in the late 1990s as their service life was ending.  The squadron began receiving F-15A/B Eagles in 1998. Was upgraded to the F-15C/D Eagle in 2004, continuing its mission as an ANG interceptor training unit.

Lineage

 Constituted as the 439th Bombardment Squadron (Medium) on 19 June 1942
 Activated on 26 June 1942
 Redesignated 439th Bombardment Squadron, Medium 1944
 Redesignated 439th Bombardment Squadron, Light on 3 February 1945
 Inactivated on 13 December 1945
 Redesignated 114th Bombardment Squadron, Light and allotted to Oregon ANG on 24 May 1946
 Allocation to Oregon ANG withdrawn June 1946
 Allotted to New York ANG, June 1946
 Organized on 1 March 1947
 Extended federal recognition on 17 June 1947
 Federalized and placed on active duty on 1 March 1951
 Redesignated 114th Bombardment Squadron, Medium on 1 April 1951
 Inactivated, released from active duty, returned to New York state control and redesignated 114th Bombardment Squadron, Light on 1 December 1952
 Activated on 1 December 1952
 Redesignated 114th Bombardment Squadron, Tactical in 1955
 Redesignated: 114th Fighter-Interceptor Squadron on 1 July 1956
 Inactivated on 30 September 1958 and allocation to the Air National Guard withdrawn
 Redesignated 114th Tactical Fighter Training Squadron and allotted to Oregon ANG in 1983
 Extended federal recognition on 1 February 1984
 Redesignated 114th Fighter Squadron on 15 March 1992

Assignments
 319th Bombardment Group, 26 June 1942
 VII Bomber Command, 18 December 1945 – 4 January 1946
 New York Air National Guard, 26 June 1946
 106th Bombardment Group, 21 March 1947 – 1 November 1952
 106th Bombardment Group (later 106th Fighter-Interceptor Group), 1 November 1952 – 30 September 1958
 142d Fighter Group, 1 February 1984
 142d Operations Group, 11 October 1995
 173d Operations Group, 1 April 1996

Stations

 Barksdale Field, Louisiana, 26 June 1942
 Harding Field, Louisiana, 8–27 August 1942
 RAF Shipdham (USAAF Station 115), England, 12 September 1942
 RAF Horsham St Faith (USAAF Station 123), England, c. 4 October 1942
 Saint-Leu Airfield, Algeria, c. 11 November 1942
 Oran Tafaraoui Airport, Algeria, 18 November 1942
 Maison Blanche Airport, Algeria, 24 November 1942
 Telergma Airfield, Algeria, c. 12 December 1942
 Oujda Airfield, French Morocco, 3 March 1943
 Rabat-Salé Airport, French Morocco, 25 April 1943
 Sedrata Airfield, Algeria, 1 June 1943

 Djedeida Airfield, Tunisia, 26 June 1943
 Decimomannu Airfield, Sardinia, Italy, c. 1 November 1943
 Serragia Airfield, Corsica, France, c. 21 September 1944 – 1 January 1945
 Bradley Field, Connecticut, 25 January 1945
 Columbia Army Air Base, South Carolina, c. 28 February–27 April 1945
 Kadena Airfield, Okinawa, Japan, c. 2 July 1945
 Machinato-Naha Airfield, Okinawa. Japan, 21 July–21 November 1945
 Fort Lawton, Washington, 4 January 1946
 Floyd Bennett Field, New York, New York, 26 June 1946 – 30 September 1958
 Klamath Falls Airport (later Kingsley Field Air National Guard Base), Oregon, 1 January 1983 – present

Aircraft

 B-26 Marauder, 1942–1944
 B-25 Mitchell, 1944–1945
 A-26 Invader, 1945–1946
 B-26 Invader, 1946–1951; 1952–1956
 B-29 Superfortress, 1951–1952
 F-94B Starfire, 1956–1957

 F-86D Sabre Interceptor, 1957–1958
 F-4C Phantom II, 1983–1988
 Block 15 ADF F-16A/B Fighting Falcon, 1988–1998
 F-15A/B Eagle, 1998–2004
 F-15C/D Eagle, 2004 – present

References 

 
 1957 Annual Report, State of New York Division of Military and Naval Affairs.
 Early history of the 106th Rescue Wing
 114th Fighter Squadron lineage and history
 Rogers, B. (2006). United States Air Force Unit Designations Since 1978. 
  Cornett, Lloyd H. and Johnson, Mildred W., A Handbook of Aerospace Defense Organization  1946 – 1980, Office of History, Aerospace Defense Center, Peterson AFB, CO (1980).

External links

Squadrons of the United States Air National Guard
Fighter squadrons of the United States Air Force
Military units and formations in Oregon